Senator Murphy or Murphey may refer to:

Members of the Northern Irish Senate
Edward Sullivan Murphy (1880–1945), Northern Irish Senator in 1929

Members of the United States Senate
Chris Murphy (born 1973), U.S. Senator from Connecticut since 2013
Edward Murphy Jr. (1836–1911), U.S. Senator from New York from 1893 to 1899
George Murphy (1902–1992), U.S. Senator from California from 1965 to 1971
Maurice J. Murphy Jr. (1927–2002), U.S. Senator from New Hampshire from 1961 to 1962
Richard L. Murphy (1875–1936), U.S. Senator from Iowa from 1933 to 1936

United States state senate members
Archibald Murphey (1777–1832), North Carolina State Senate
Arthur Murphy (Idaho politician) (1898–1977), Idaho State Senate
Austin Murphy (born 1927), Pennsylvania State Senate
Charles Murphey (1799–1861), Georgia State Senate
Charles Frederick Murphy (1875–1934), New York State Senate
Dennis Murphy (Wisconsin politician) (fl. 1840s–1850s), Wisconsin State Senate
George A. Murphy (1923–2015), New York State Senate
Henry C. Murphy (1810–1882), New York State Senate
James A. Murphy (1889–1939), Michigan State Senate
James W. Murphy (politician) (1852–1913), Wisconsin State Senate
Jeremiah Henry Murphy (1835–1893), Iowa State Senate
John McLeod Murphy (1827–1871), New York State Senate
John R. Murphy (1856–1932), Massachusetts State Senate
Joseph L. Murphy (1907–1973), Massachusetts State Senate
Laura Murphy (fl. 2010s), Illinois State Senate
Matt Murphy (Illinois politician) (born 1970), Illinois State Senate
Michael C. Murphy (New York politician) (1839–1903), New York State Senate
Peter P. Murphy (1801–1880), New York State Senate
Raymond M. Murphy (born 1927), Michigan State Senate
Rick Murphy (fl. 2000s–2010s), Arizona State Senate
Roger P. Murphy (1923–2009), Wisconsin State Senate
Seba Murphy (1788–1856), Michigan State Senate
Steve Murphy (politician) (born 1957), Minnesota State Senate
Terrence Murphy (New York politician) (born 1966), New York State Senate
Terry Murphy (American politician), Montana State Senate
Tim Murphy (American politician) (born 1952), Pennsylvania State Senate
Wendell H. Murphy (fl. 1960s–2000s), North Carolina State Senate

See also
Murphy